Darryl Anthony Williams (born June 22, 1961) is a United States Army general who serves as the commanding general of United States Army Europe and Africa since 28 June 2022 and commander of Allied Land Command since 4 August 2022. He previously served as the 60th Superintendent of the United States Military Academy, the first African-American to hold the position. He served as commander of Allied Land Command as a lieutenant general from 24 June 2016 to 29 June 2018.

Early life
Williams grew up in Fairfax County, Virginia, and attended Mount Vernon High School playing center for the  Majors 1979 state champion basketball team and a defensive end on the football team. Williams graduated in 1979.

Military career

Williams graduated from the United States Military Academy in December 1983 and was commissioned a second lieutenant of Field Artillery. His first assignment was an executive officer and fire direction officer in Schweinfurt, Germany, with the 3rd Infantry Division. Next, Williams was assigned to XVIII Airborne Corps, deploying to Southwest Asia in support of Operations Desert Shield and Desert Storm. He was then assigned to West Point as a Tactical Officer. Later, Williams served in various command positions in Europe, including commander of United States Army Africa in Vicenza, Italy; deputy chief of staff G3/5/7 of the United States Army in Europe, Wiesbaden, Germany; and commanding general of the United States Army Warrior Transition Command and assistant surgeon general for Warrior Care and Transition.

In 2014, Williams was tapped by President Barack Obama to manage the United States' response to the West African Ebola virus epidemic.

On 24 June 2016, Williams assumed command of NATO Allied Land Command in Turkey.

Williams's military education includes the Field Artillery Officer Basic and Advanced Courses, United States Army Command and General Staff College, School of Advanced Military Studies, and the United States Naval War College. He holds Masters’ degrees in Leadership Development, Military Art and Science, and National Security and Strategic Studies.

In June 2022, Williams was nominated for promotion to general and appointment as Commanding General, U.S. Army Europe and Africa. He replaced Christopher G. Cavoli, who was to take command of the United States European Command, on 28 June 2022. He assumed command of Allied Land Command a second time from Lieutenant General Roger Cloutier on 4 August 2022.

Awards and decorations

References

1961 births
Living people
Military personnel from Virginia
Naval War College alumni
People from Alexandria, Virginia
Recipients of the Defense Distinguished Service Medal
Recipients of the Distinguished Service Medal (US Army)
Recipients of the Defense Superior Service Medal
Recipients of the Legion of Merit
Superintendents of the United States Military Academy
United States Army generals
United States Military Academy alumni